The Altan-Ölgii National Cemetery is a cemetery located in Ulaanbaatar, Mongolia.

Notable burials

Choibalsan and Sukhbaatar 
The revolutionary hero Damdin Sükhbaatar was buried here in 1923, but was later exhumed and reinterred into Sükhbaatar's Mausoleum together with Khorloogiin Choibalsan. The corpses of both rulers were again exhumed, ritually burned, and the ashes entombed at Altan-Ölgii in 2005.

Other 

 Yumjaagiin Tsedenbal
 John Gombojab Hangin

References

External links
 

National cemeteries
Ulaanbaatar